Her Five-Foot Highness is a 1920 American western drama film directed by Harry L. Franklin and written by Hal Hoadley. The film stars Edith Roberts, Virginia Ware, Ogden Crane, Harold Miller, Stanhope Wheatcroft and Kathleen Kirkham. The film was released in April 1920, by Universal Film Manufacturing Company.

Cast       
Edith Roberts as Ellen
Virginia Ware as Lady Harriet
Ogden Crane as Lesley Saunders
Harold Miller as Sir Gerald Knowlton
Stanhope Wheatcroft as Lord Pomeroy
Kathleen Kirkham as Lady Clara
Rudolph Christians as Solicitor
Hugh Saxon as English Butler
Leota Lorraine as Chorus Girl
Tom London as Slim Higgins 
Henry Woodward as Williams

References

External links
 

1920 films
1920s English-language films
Silent American drama films
1920 drama films
Universal Pictures films
Films directed by Harry L. Franklin
American silent feature films
American black-and-white films
1920s American films
Silent American Western (genre) films